Pazuzu Algarad ( born John Alexander Lawson; August 12, 1978 – October 28, 2015), was an American murderer responsible for the killing of two men. Born as John Alexander Lawson, Pazuzu legally changed his name in 2002 to conform with his satanist beliefs. The surname 'Ilah Algarad' means the lord of the locusts in Arabic. He committed suicide in jail to escape conviction of his crimes. It is still unknown what instrument he used to cut himself, but some believe he bit himself since he had previously filed down his teeth.

In 2012, he was convicted as an accessory after the fact for the shooting death of Joseph Emmrick Chandler, in Dohanna Park near the Yadkin River in 2010. In 2014, he was arrested after skeletal remains were discovered in shallow graves in his backyard. His girlfriend was arrested as well. She was charged and later pled guilty for her role in the deaths.

He lived at a house at 2749 Knob Hill Drive in Clemmons, North Carolina, with his mother. The house was demolished in 2015, after being declared unfit for human occupation.

Following his death, he became the subject of a documentary called The Devil You Know.

References 

 
 
 

1978 births
2015 deaths
American murderers
American Theistic Satanists
Suicides by sharp instrument in the United States
Suicides in North Carolina
People who committed suicide in prison custody